Ali-Asghar Zarei (1956 – 6 December 2020) was an Iranian military officer and conservative politician who served as a member of the Parliament of Iran representing Tehran, Rey, Shemiranat and Eslamshahr.

References

1956 births
2020 deaths
Members of the 8th Islamic Consultative Assembly
Members of the 9th Islamic Consultative Assembly
Deputies of Tehran, Rey, Shemiranat and Eslamshahr
Front of Islamic Revolution Stability politicians
Presidential advisers of Iran
Islamic Revolutionary Guard Corps personnel of the Iran–Iraq War
Deaths from the COVID-19 pandemic in Iran